Jinxian County is a county of Jiangxi Province, China, it is under the administration of the prefecture-level city of Nanchang, the provincial capital.

Administrative divisions
Jinxian County has 9 towns and 12 townships.
9 towns

12 townships

Climate

References

External links 
 Local region's home page 

 
Jinxian